Domhnall mac Alasdair was a son of Alasdair Mór mac Domhnaill, and a member of Clann Domhnaill. Domhnall is attested by the fifteenth-century manuscript National Library of Scotland Advocates' 72.1.1 (also known as 1467 MS and 1450 MS). He may be identical to Domhnall of Islay. The latter's attestations suggest that he was a contestant to the Clann Domhnaill lordship, and may have possessed the chiefship.

Citations

References

Primary sources

Secondary sources

13th-century Scottish people
14th-century Scottish people
Clan MacAlister
Clan Donald
Medieval Gaels from Scotland
People from Argyll and Bute